Glen Osmond is a suburb of Adelaide, South Australia in the City of Burnside which is in the foothills of the Adelaide Hills. It is well known for the road intersection on the western side of the suburb, where the South Eastern Freeway (National Route M1) from the Adelaide Hills and the main route from Melbourne splits into National Route A17 Portrush Road (north, the main route towards Port Adelaide), Glen Osmond Road, Adelaide (northwest towards Adelaide city centre) and state route A3 Cross Road west towards the coast and southern suburbs.

History
In 1841, silver and lead were found at Glen Osmond, leading to the establishment of the Wheal Gawler and Wheal Watkins mines. The mines operated in the 1840s, and again in the 1890s. Cedric Stanton Hicks, founder of the Australian Army Catering Corps, died here in 1976.

Notable people
 Nancy Cato (1917–2000), writer and activist, born and raised in Glen Osmond

Bibliography
Tom Gill, whose family were early settlers in the area, published a History and Topography of Glen Osmond in 1902. A facsimile edition of the book was published by the State Library of South Australia in 1974.

References

Suburbs of Adelaide